Pussycat or Pussy Cat may refer to:

 Cat, a domestic feline pet

Music

Bands
 Pussycat (band), a Dutch country and pop group
 The Pussycats, a 1960s Norwegian rock band
 The Pussycats, a group signed to Kama Sutra Records

Albums
 Pussy Cats, by Harry Nilsson, 1974
 "Pussy Cats" Starring the Walkmen, a cover of the 1974 album by the Walkmen, 2006
 Pussycat (album), by Juliana Hatfield, 2017

Songs
 "Pussycat" (Wyclef Jean song), 2002
 "Pussy Cat", a song by the Ames Brothers, 1958
 "Pussycat", a song by Missy Elliott from Under Construction

Other uses
 "Pussy Cat Pussy Cat", an English nursery rhyme
 Pussycat Theaters, a chain of adult movie theaters in California, US
 Pussycat, one of Catwoman's minions, played by Lesley Gore, on the 1967 TV series Batman
 Pussycat, a robot in the TV series Robot Wars
 Josie and the Pussycats, a list of media featuring a fictional rock band
 The Adventures of Pussycat, a 1968 black & white Marvel Comics magazine

See also

 Cat (disambiguation)
 Pussy (disambiguation)